Hugo Nicolini (born November 15, 1949) is an Argentinian former footballer who played as a defender most notably in the North American Soccer League.

Career 
Nicolini played professional football in his native Argentina, and in 1972 played abroad in the National Soccer League with Toronto Italia. In 1976, he played with league rivals the Montreal Castors. Throughout his two-year tenure with Montreal he was named to the NSL All-Star team. In late 1977, Nicolini along with six Montreal players were traded to the Ottawa Tigers in order to assist in their playoff match against Toronto Croatia to gain promotion to the NSL First Division. The transaction provided Montreal the bargaining rights to Mick Jones.

In 1978, he signed with the Rochester Lancers of the North American Soccer League. He recorded his first goal for Rochester on July 15, 1978 against New England Tea Men. He in his debut season with Rochester he appeared in 24 matches and recorded 1 goal. The following season Rochester didn't re-sign Nicolini for the 1979 season. In 1981, he returned to the National Soccer League to play with Toronto Panhellenic. In 1982, he returned to his former club Toronto Italia. In 1983, he played in the Canadian Professional Soccer League with the Hamilton Steelers.

Managerial career  
Nicolini served as the player-coach for the Montreal Castors in the National Soccer League for the 1977 season.

References 

1949 births
Living people
Argentine footballers
Argentine football managers
Toronto Italia players
Montreal Castors players
Rochester Lancers (1967–1980) players
Hamilton Steelers (1981–1992) players
Canadian National Soccer League players
North American Soccer League (1968–1984) players
Canadian Professional Soccer League (original) players
Association football defenders
Footballers from Buenos Aires
Canadian National Soccer League coaches
Argentine expatriate footballers
Argentine expatriate sportspeople in Canada
Argentine expatriate sportspeople in the United States
Expatriate soccer players in Canada
Expatriate soccer players in the United States